The Ship of Theseus is a thought experiment about whether an object which has had all of its original components replaced remains the same object. According to legend, Theseus, the mythical Greek founder-king of Athens, rescued the children of Athens from King Minos after slaying the minotaur and then escaped onto a ship going to Delos. Each year, the Athenians commemorated this legend by taking the ship on a pilgrimage to Delos to honor Apollo. A question was raised by ancient philosophers: After several centuries of maintenance, if each individual part of the Ship of Theseus was replaced, one at a time, was it still the same ship? 

In contemporary philosophy, this thought experiment has applications to the philosophical study of identity over time, and has inspired a variety of proposed solutions in contemporary philosophy of mind concerned with the persistence of personal identity.

History

In its original formulation, the "Ship of Theseus" paradox concerns a debate over whether or not a ship that had all of its components replaced one by one would remain the same ship.  The account of the problem has been preserved by Plutarch in his Life of Theseus:

Centuries later, the philosopher Thomas Hobbes extended the thought experiment by supposing that a custodian gathered up all of the decayed parts of the ship as they were disposed of and replaced by the Athenians, and used those decaying planks to build a second ship. Hobbes posed the question of which of the two resulting ships, the custodians or the Athenians, was the same ship as the "original" ship.

Hobbes considers the two resulting ships as illustrating two different definitions of "Identity" or sameness that are being compared to the original ship: 1) the ship that maintains the same "Form" as the original, that which persists through complete replacement of material, and 2) the ship made of the same "Matter", that which stops being 100% the same ship when the first part is replaced.

Proposed resolutions
The Ship of Theseus paradox can be thought of as an example of a puzzle of material constitution, that is, a problem with determining the relationship between an object and the material that it is made out of.

Constitution is not identity
According to the Stanford Encyclopedia of Philosophy, the most popular solution is to accept the conclusion, that the material that the ship is made out of is not the same object as the ship, but that the two objects simply occupy the same space at the same time.

Temporal parts

Another common theory put forth by David Lewis, is to divide up all objects into three-dimensional time-slices which are temporally distinct; which avoids the issue that the two different ships exist in the same space at one time and a different space at another time by considering the objects to be distinct from each other at all points in time.

Cognitive science
According to other scientists, the thought puzzle arises because of extreme externalism: the assumption that what is true in our minds is true in the world. Chomsky says that this is not an unassailable assumption, from the perspective of the natural sciences, because human intuition is often mistaken. Cognitive science would treat this thought puzzle as the subject of an investigation of the human mind. Studying this human confusion can reveal much about the brain's operation, but little about the nature of the human-independent external world.

Chomsky’s proposed solution requires accepting a form of internalist semantics, such as Julius Moravcsik’s AITIA-ational theory of lexicon. Moravcsik’s theory deriving out of Aristotle’s four causes, sees the causes as explanatory schemes, which makes understanding possible, for humans. At most there are four types of AITIA: 1) Constitutive 2) Formal 3) Agentive 4) Telic. Confusion arise when one uses properties of one of these AITIA’s to talk about another. For our purpose AITIA are frameworks to view the world

For example, suppose if Ram and Sam took out (individually) a different copy of the same book, say The Brothers Karamazov, from the library. Then we can ask, did Ram and Sam take out the same or different book? From one point of view, the pov of Formal AITIA it is the same book, however from the pov of constitutive AITIA it is different. Now if say Sam’s book gets burnt, one cannot conclude that Ram’s book got burnt too, because burning book is related to their constitutive AITIA. Or suppose if every copy of The Brothers Karamazov was burnt, does the book exist? Yes if we take the book’s formal AITIA, no if we take the book’s constitutive AITIA. For examples of this kind see, Chomsky (1992)

In the Ship of Theseus example, the ship of Theseus is the answer (AITIA) to the following “dia ti” question: “What is the thing upon which Theseus and the young Athenians escaped to Delos?” answer, the ship of Theseus, here we are using the Agentive AITIA. However when we start viewing the ship of Theseus from a constitutive AITIA frame, planks and oars, we are lead to incoherence if we expect of it properties which belong to the Agentive AITIA framework.

Following on from this observation, a significant strand in cognitive science would consider The Ship, not as a thing, nor even a collection of objectively existing thing parts, but rather as an organisational structure that has perceptual continuity. When Theseus thinks of his ship, he has expectations about what parts can be found, how they interact, and how they interact with the wider world. As long as there is a time/space continuity between this set of relationships, it is The Ship of Theseus.

Alternative forms
In Europe, several independent tales and stories feature knives that have had their blades and handles replaced several times but are still used and represent the same knife. France has Jeannot's knife, Spain uses Jeannot's knife as a proverb, though it is referred to simply as "the family knife", and Hungary has "Lajos Kossuth's pocket knife". Several variants or alternative statements of the underlying problem are known, including the grandfather's axe and Trigger's broom, where an old broom or axe has had both its head and its handle replaced, leaving no original components.

In Japan, the Ise Grand Shrine is rebuilt every twenty years with entirely "new wood". The continuity over the centuries is considered spiritual and comes from the source of the wood, which is harvested from an adjoining forest that is considered sacred.

The ancient Buddhist text Da zhidu lun contains a similar philosophical puzzle: a story of a traveler who encountered two demons in the night. As one demon ripped off all parts of the traveler's body one by one, the other demon replaced them with those of a corpse, and the traveler was confused about who he was.

In The Three Basic Facts of Existence, Piyadassi Thera uses the teachings of Dharma to suggest that nothing in the universe is ever the same. 

The French critic and essayist, Roland Barthes, refers at least twice to a ship that is entirely rebuilt, in the preface to his Essais Critiques (1971) and later in his Roland Barthes par Roland Barthes (1975); in the latter, the persistence of the form of the ship is seen as a key structuralist principle. He calls this ship the Argo, on which Theseus was said to have sailed with Jason; he may have confused the Argo (referred to in passing in Plutarch's Theseus at 19.4) with the ship that sailed from Crete (Theseus, 23.1).

See also

 Brain implant
 Bundle theory 
 Haecceity
 Interchangeable parts
 Mereological essentialism
 Neurath's boat
 Perdurantism
 Philosophy of self 
 Przekładaniec
 Sorites paradox
 Śūnyatā
 Swampman
 Transporter (Star Trek)

Notes

References

Further reading

External links
 
 S. Marc Cohen's Lecture notes on "Identity, Persistence, and the Ship of Theseus" from the University of Washington

Identity paradoxes
Logic
Identity (philosophy)
Logical paradoxes
Metaphors referring to ships
Theseus
Thought experiments in philosophy
Philosophical paradoxes